Lost Sounds was a rock band from Memphis, Tennessee. Starting in March 1999, the band was made up of Rich Crook on drums, Patrick Jordan on bass, Jay Reatard on synth, guitar and vocals, and Alicja Trout on synth, guitar and vocals. The band, originally working within the garage rock genre, had a collection of analog keyboards Trout had used in her previous band The Clears. The bizarre combination of new wave synths and mangled guitars showed a dark wave influence as well. The band frequently dealt with dark, apocalyptic themes ranging from the Book of Revelation (Breathing Machine) to the Columbine High School shootings (Blackcoats/Whitefear). The band's last show was in May 2005 in Stuttgart, Germany. Rich Crook currently writes and records music in the band Lover! Former band members have since formed Sweet Knives as a self described reboot of Lost Sounds sans the late Jay Reatard.

Discography 
Lost Sounds 7", Solid Sex Lovie Doll, 1999
Memphis Is Dead LP, Bigneck Records, 2000
1+1 = Nothing 7", Empty Records, 2000
Outtakes & Demos Vol. 1, Contaminated Records, 2001
Black-Wave 2xLP, Empty Records, 2001
Demos & Outtakes, Vol. 1, Hate Records, 2001
Demos II, On On Switch, 2003
Rat's Brains & Microchips LP, Empty Records, 2002
Future Touch EP, In The Red Records, 2004
Lost Sounds LP, In The Red Records, 2004
Motocycle Leather Boy 7", Tic Tac Totally, 2007
Blac Static, Fat Possum Records, 2011

References

External links 

Lost Sounds at Grunnenrocks

Garage rock groups from Tennessee
Garage punk groups
Indie rock musical groups from Tennessee
Musical groups from Memphis, Tennessee
In the Red artists